Last words are a person's final words spoken before death.

Last Words may also refer to:

History
 List of last words, collection of last words attributed to historical figures

Film and television
 Last Words (1968 film), a short film directed by Werner Herzog
 Last Words (2020 film), an American film directed by Jonathan Nossiter
 "Last Words" (How I Met Your Mother), a television episode

Literature
 Last Words (book), a 2009 memoir by George Carlin
 Last Words: The Final Journals of William S. Burroughs, a 2000 book edited by James Grauerholz

Music
 The Last Words (band), an Australian punk band
 Last Words: The Final Recordings, a 2011 album by Screaming Trees
 Last Words (EP), by Ryan Hemsworth, 2012
 ”Last Words” (Ai song), 2003
 "Last Words" (Ten Sharp song), 1986
 "Last Words", a song by the Real Tuesday Weld from The London Book of the Dead

See also
 Last Word, a factual BBC radio series broadcast weekly on Radio 4
 List of last words
 Last words of Julius Caesar
 Last Words of the Emperor Marcus Aurelius, an 1844 painting
 Sayings of Jesus on the cross, also known as The Seven Last Words
 Last Words of the Executed, a 2010 book by Robert K. Elder
 The Last Words of Dutch Schultz, an unproduced screenplay by William S. Burroughs
 The Last Words of David'', a 1949 choral work by Randall Thompson
 Famous Last Words (disambiguation)
 The Last Word (disambiguation)